This is a list of fictional countries supposedly located in North, Central, or South America.

North and South America

Oceania: A totalitarian superstate combining the United States and the British Empire, in George Orwell's Nineteen Eighty-Four, consisting of the entire Americas, as well as Great Britain, Ireland, Greenland, Iceland, Australia, New Zealand, Polynesia, and Southern Africa.

North America
Aemonkia: a federal democratic communist state under a totalitarian hereditary dictatorship in North America in Dead or Alive series.
Ayx Empire: a fascist absolute monarchy in North America in the Ninja Gaiden series. It is ruled by the evil Emperor Garuda.
Magisteria: a North American Germanic, Romance and Slavic English, French, German and Dutch-speaking fascist absolute monarchy in Dead or Alive series. It is ruled by Lord Tatorusis.
San Sombrero: a North American country from a parody travel guidebook; from the same authors as Molvanîa and Phaic Tăn.
Sarcozia: a republic in North America in WinBack, where the terrorist group the Crying Lions originate from.

Canada

Brobdingnag: A fictional country from the novel Gulliver's Travels by Jonathan Swift. As described by Swift, Brobdingnag extends some 2000 miles westward from Canada's Pacific coast, and is inhabited by a race of giants.
Grand Prairie: Métis nation located in Central Canada.

United States
Bible Belt: country formed by Evangelical Christians in the former Confederate States of America in the novel Prayers for the Assassin by Robert Ferrigno.
Commonwealth of American States (CAS): Fictional country located in the territory of what was once the United States in Arthur C. Clarke's The Hammer of God. Its capital is located in Washington, its legislature is called the General Assembly whose members are referred to as senators, and West America is one of its constituent regions.
Republic of Columbia: 
Countries in Fallout (video game series).

Caesar's Legion is an autocratic, ultra-reactionary, utilitarian slaver army founded in 2247 by Edward Sallow (Who later adopted the name "Caesar") and Joshua Graham. It is largely inspired and partially based on the ancient Roman Empire, though it isn't the Roman Empire, the Roman Republic or even its military, the Legion. It is a slave army with trappings of foreign-conscripted Roman legionaries during the late empire. All military, no civilian, and with none of the supporting civilian culture. It appears only in Fallout: New Vegas.

The New California Republic (NCR) is a federal presidential republic founded in New California by Aradesh also formerly leader of Shady Sands, comprising five contiguous states and additional territories and holdings in pre-War regions in Nevada, Arizona, Oregon, and parts of Mexico. The Republic dedicates itself to the values of the old world: Democracy, liberty, the rule of law, all in order to make the wasteland a better place. However, its policies resulted in difficulties in recent years. It was founded in 2186, is mentioned in Fallout 3 and Fallout 4, and appears in Fallout 2 & Fallout: New Vegas.

The Enclave is a nation state established after the Great War, formed by members of the pre-War United States government and military industrial complex. It claims authority over the territory of the United States of America, considering itself the legal continuation of the U.S. government and styling itself as such. First appearing in Fallout 2, then later  in Fallout 3, its add-on Broken Steel, and is mentioned from its few remaining now retired survivors appears in Fallout: New Vegas with former soldier who now follower for Children of Atom in Fallout 4's add-on Far Harbor.

Shi (Fictional Nation) is a post-apocalyptic nation that is against all post-great war politics. It was founded by survived Chinese spies that established most areas from ruins of San Francisco as City State and uses some elements of the Chinese culture, such as their ancestors' customs, clothing, language, and demeanor. The younger generations, however, seem to rely more on the surviving popular culture interpretations of Chinese culture (such as kung-fu holovideos), rather than actual cultural traditions. It appears in Fallout 2 and is indirectly mentioned in Fallout 4.

Republic of Dave (also formerly called Kingdom of Tom, Kingdom of Larry, the Republic of Stevie-Ray, Billsylvania, and the New Republic of Stevie-Ray) is a small farming settlement in the far northeast corner of the Capital Wasteland (Fallout 3) that is considered by its close-knit inhabitants to be a sovereign nation-state. This nation is actually closer to a Micronation, because since on-off monarchies and republics with an only family control it, and they only had one citizen working as a teacher or merchant (optional) during the game. This "Nation" only appears in Fallout 3.

The Free Economic Zone of New Vegas is a neoliberal autocratic faction led by Pre-Great War survivor Robert House in Fallout: New Vegas. Although it is formally founded if House establishes sovereignty over the Mojave region, in practice, it exists in a practical capacity throughout Mr House's rule in New Vegas.

Coalition States: A fascist empire founded upon the post-apocalyptic ruins of the American Midwest in the Rifts role-playing game.
Countries in Jericho (2006 TV series)
Allied States of America: A country in the television series Jericho that forms after nuclear weapons are detonated in many of the United States' major cities.  Its capital is Cheyenne, Wyoming, and it controls all of the states west of the Mississippi River, with the exception of Texas.

United States of America: A country in the television series Jericho.  It is only a fictional country because it only rules over the states east of the Mississippi River. Its capital is Columbus, Ohio.

Republic of Texas: A country that was formerly the state of Texas, but has the same borders.  Its capital is San Antonio because Dallas and Houston were destroyed. it side with the United States of America at the end of season 2.

Countries in The Man in the High Castle

In the world of The Man in the High Castle the United States has been partitioned by the victorious Axis powers after World War II.

Pacific States of America, a puppet state of the Empire of Japan consisting of the west coast of the former United States. Its capital is Sacramento. In the television series it is an occupied province called the Japanese Pacific States and does also include Alaska and the west coast of Canada.

United States of America, a puppet state of Nazi Germany consisting of the northern east coast of the former United States and several central states. In the television series it is an occupied province called Nazi America or the American Reich.

"The South", a racist regime in the Southeast of the former United States, which collaborates with Nazi Germany. It does not appear in the television series.

Rocky Mountain States, a neutral buffer zone state consisting of the remaining territory of the former United States. Its capital is Canon City. In the television series it is portrayed as a lawless Neutral Zone.

Countries in Revolution

 Monroe Republic was ruled by Sebastian Monroe. His government was a neo-feudal republic dictatorship controlling the former Northeastern United States including Michigan, Wisconsin, most of Virginia, New Jersey, as well as a small part of Canada.  The Republic's military, the Monroe Militia, enforces strict laws against citizens owning firearms, which are often punished by death.

 The Patriots are semi-Paramiltiary/Political group formed from the pre-blackout American government. Their "capital" was Guantánamo Bay before they returned to Washington D.C.

 Georgia Federation is a nation-state with a government largely modeled after pre-blackout america located in the former 'Dixie' states. They have a high population and standard of living.

 Plains Nation, is dominated by Native American-like tribes after blackout, whom circulate a specified territory in the Midwest. There are also many scattered settlements, though they are largely self-governed.

Texas, a nation located in the former US state of Texas, as well as former Mexican Territory, this nation's governance is mostly like that of pre-blackout america, and a high standard of living is enjoyed. While not as advanced as the Georgia Federation, it is stated to be more militarily capable, and the 'Texas Rangers' are served as the main military force. Whilst military and farming technology here is mundane, Texans show great architectural skill, and even have networked newspapers, most notably the 'Austin Star Times'.

 California Commonwealth, a nation formed from the previous states of California, Oregon and Washington.

Wasteland, an area shown on a map of the Former continental U.S., it is likely that this area is a lawless region, rather than a political entity.
Ecotopia: an ecological utopia appearing in the novels Ecotopia and Ecotopia Emerging by Ernest Callenbach. See also Cascadia, a secessionist idea based in part on Callenbach's Ecotopia.
Gilead: a stereotypical Christian republic in the novel The Handmaid's Tale by Margaret Atwood
Greater Texas: successor state to the United States, encompassing most of North America, in the novel A Spectre is Haunting Texas by Fritz Leiber
Jesusland: As it appeared on the web following the 2004 Elections.
Opium: from the novel The House of the Scorpion by Nancy Farmer. It is a future nation between Aztlan (formerly Mexico) and the United States. This nation is part of a deal made between the Mexican and American governments and a powerful drug lord named El Patrón, promising that the drugs he makes will be sold in Europe and Asia and will also take care of the illegal immigrant problem if he is allowed a strip of land.
New Korean Federation of Occupied America: A totalitarian puppet state formed as a result of an invasion by the Greater Korean Republic in the video game Homefront. Stretches from the West Coast to an irradiated Mississippi River, as well as Alaska and Hawaii, and borders the actual United States east of the Mississippi.
Panem: A post-apocalyptic country in "The Hunger Games" Trilogy that exists in parts of what used to be the United States, Canada, and Mexico.  It consists of a wealthy city known as The Capitol, as well as Districts 1 through 12, which each provide a certain material for the Capitol's residents.  The Districts were forced to send challengers to compete in the Hunger Games, long contests with typically only one winner, the last contestant to remain alive.
Petoria: Is an Oligarchic Micro or Small nation that only occupies the Griffin household and later invades the Swanson's backyard as "Joehio" in the Family Guy episode "E. Peterbus Unum" and briefly mentioned in "Stew-Roids".
"Republic" of Boulder City, also called "Boulder Free Zone": It is a re-established democratic city-state formed and founded by "Mother" Abagail in aftermath of World-ending flu; which actually closer of Theocratic-based democracy which formed in Stephen King's The Stand.
Countries in Russian Amerika, the alternate history novel, has 20th-century North America made up of several independent sovereign nations: The point of divergence is that the United States lost the Civil War with the Confederacy; and as a post-war consequence, the Union loses all ground west of the Mississippi River as American-claimed western lands secede from the Union.
United States of America (formerly Maine, New Hampshire, Vermont, Massachusetts, New York State, Pennsylvania, Maryland, New Jersey, West Virginia, Ohio, Michigan, Wisconsin, Minnesota, Iowa, American Samoa, Guam, Northern Mariana Islands, Puerto Rico, U.S. Virgin Islands, Nova Scotia, Prince Edward Island, New Brunswick, the majority of Illinois, and the southeastern part of Quebec)
Confederate States of America (formerly Virginia, North Carolina, South Carolina, Georgia, Florida, Alabama, Mississippi, Louisiana, Arkansas, Tennessee, Kentucky, Missouri, the southwestern portion of Illinois, the eastern half of Kansas, the Philippines, most of Mexico, Cuba, and Hispaniola) 
Republic of Texas (formerly Texas, Oklahoma, Chihuahua, Coahuila, and the majority of New Mexico) 
First People's Nation (formerly Sonora, Montana, Idaho, Wyoming, Colorado, North Dakota, South Dakota, Nebraska, Arizona, the westernmost portion of New Mexico, the western half of Kansas, the central and southwestern portion of Ontario, and the southernmost portion of Manitoba) 
Franklin (formerly eastern Tennessee and western North Carolina) 
Deseret (formerly Utah, the northeastern portion of Nevada)
Republic of California (formerly California, Baja California, Oregon, and the majority of Nevada)
French Canada (formerly Quebec, Newfoundland, Labrador, the northeastern portion of Ontario)
British Canada (formerly Nunavut, the Northwest Territories, Alberta, Saskatchewan, Washington state, the northwestern portion of Ontario, the southeastern portion of the Yukon Territory, and the majority of British Columbia and Manitoba)
New Spain (formerly Central America)
Republic of Hawaii (formerly Hawaii, the Outlying Islands)
Russian Amerika (formerly Alaska, the majority of the Yukon Territory, and the northwestern portion of British Columbia)
Countries in Crimson Skies
Industrial States of America, a large industrial nation created by the secession of Michigan, Illinois, Minnesota, Ohio, Wisconsin, and Indiana in the Crimson Skies series. Its capital is Chicago.
Empire State, a nation formed out of the secession of New York, New Jersey, and Pennsylvania in the Crimson Skies universe. The capital is New York City.
Arixo, the republic formed by the merger of the seceded states New Mexico and Arizona in the Crimson Skies series. Its capital is in Phoenix.
Navajo Territory, a homeland state for the Navajo northern Arizona in the Crimson Skies series.
Pacifica, the peaceful Crimson Skies nation created out of former British Columbia, Washington state, and Oregon. Its capital is South Vancouver.
Nation of Hollywood, a bombastic and arrogant nation with its capital in Los Angeles created out of California due to secession in Crimson Skies. Its air force maintains relative hegemony over the Gulf of Mexico.
People's Collective, a Christian-based communist state with a capital in Omaha created out of the seceded states of North Dakota, South Dakota, Nebraska, Kansas, and Iowa from Crimson Skies.
Deseret, a Mormon theocratic country created out of Utah in Crimson Skies.
Lakota Territory, a homeland for the Lakota people created out of annexed land from the states of North Dakota and Montana. From Crimson Skies.
Confederation of Dixie, a half-revival of the Confederate States of America containing the states of Florida, Alabama, Georgia, Mississippi, Missouri, and Arkansas from Crimson Skies. Its capital is in Atlanta.
Atlantic Coalition, a loose confederacy of the states of Massachusetts, Rhode Island, and Connecticut capitaled in Boston from Crimson Skies.
Free Colorado, a nearly lawless nation capitaled in Denver from Crimson Skies.
Countries in Fracture:
The Atlantic Alliance, a nation create out Washington D.C. and most others on the Eastern Seaboard that practice extensive high technology and cyborging to augment it citizens survival. Its capital is very implied be Washington D.C. itself, ruled by Unnamed Atlantican president that have anti-biotechnology policies spark the Second American Civil War in 2161.
Republic of Pacifica, a nation created out California and several other states on the Western Seaboard that practices extensive bioengineering to augment its citizens survival. Its capital is in San Francisco, it is ruled by General Nathan Sheridan, and its secession sparks the Second American Civil War in 2161.

Caribbean

 Fantastic Island: A French West Indian island, plagued by supernatural activity. It appears in the Canadian fantasy series Martin Mystery.
 Porto Santo: a tiny island nation in Latin America visited by Steve Urkel in the Family Matters episode "South of the Border". (Note: Porto Santo is a real island of Madeira Archipelago)
 Republica Libra: island country in the Caribbean with similarities to the Dominican Republic, in the novel Shooting Script by Gavin Lyall. Capital: Santo Bartolomeo.
 San Escobar: a non-existent country, mistakenly mentioned by Polish Minister of Foreign Affairs Witold Waszczykowski.
 San Lorenzo: a tiny, rocky island nation located in the Caribbean Sea in Kurt Vonnegut's Cat's Cradle.
 Tropico: a tiny Caribbean Spanish-speaking island-nation of non-specified localisation on which is set the action of the Cold War themed eponymous series of city-building games; it can be either communist or capitalistic, democratic or dictatorial, depending on how the player manages the state of government.
 Vilena: a small island and independent country located in Gulf of Mexico ruled by a dictator general Garza. The island appeared in the movie The Expendables.

Central America
Amerzone: Central American country, the setting of Amerzone video game.
Anchuria: Central American country based on Honduras in the novel Cabbages and Kings by O. Henry.
Balio: Meso-American nation with a population numbering nine million,5% of whom are indigenous Aztec. Featured in episode 18, season 2 of Scorpion.
Boca Grande: Central American country based on El Salvador in A Book of Common Prayer by Joan Didion.
British Hidalgo: tiny Central American country in the novel Limekiller by Avram Davidson (See Hidalgo).
Chimerica: Central American country from the computer game Hidden Agenda.
El Honduragua: a fictional country in Central America from the sketch show Spitting Image, whose politics are dominated by fascist parties all supported by the United States. Its name is a portmanteau of El Salvador, the British Honduras (now Belize) and Nicaragua.
Hidalgo: Central American country in the Doc Savage novels and film.
Isthmus: a fictionalized version of Panama in the James Bond film Licence to Kill.
Maguadora: tiny Central American country in the film Whoops Apocalypse.
Managuay: a Central American country in Buck Danny Thunder over the Cordillera and No-Fly Zone. The name is based on Managua, the capital city of Nicaragua. 
San Esperito: an island country somewhere in the Central America, in the 2006 video game Just Cause.
San Lorenzo: a republic in Central America in both mentioned in Hey Arnold! and later finally appeared in Hey Arnold!: The Jungle Movie.
San Marcos (4): civil-war torn Central American country in an episode of MacGyver, in the 1971 motion picture Bananas, in an episode of The A-Team, as well as a 2014 episode of Archer'.
San Pequeño: Country where nurse Gina Cuevas came from on 1990s sitcom Nurses.
San Sombrèro: Central American country from a parody travel guidebook; from the same authors as Molvanîa and Phaic Tăn.
Tecan: Central American country in the novel A Flag for Sunrise by Robert Stone.
Tibecuador: Central American country in The Fairly OddParents.
Tijata: Central American dictatorship from the film The In-Laws.
Val Verde: Spanish-speaking country resembling Panama, Nicaragua or maybe Colombia, in the films Commando, Predator and Die Hard 2.

South America
Abari: a British (and ex-British) territory in South America in novels written by John Hearne and Morris Cargill.
Amazonia: country somewhere in northern South America, used as a fictional location in a movie script, mentioned in the novel Shooting Script by Gavin Lyall.
Andes Mallorca: South American country in the computer game Strike Commander roughly resembling real-world Colombia.
Aquilea: South American country in the film Les Trottoirs de SaturneAzuera: in the Sir John Appleby novel The Open House by Michael Innes
Brazuela: industrialized South American nation between Venezuela and Brazil in Totally Spies! TV series.
Cordillera: country straddling the Andes in the novel High Citadel by Desmond Bagley. Capital: Santillana.
Costa Gravas: former Communist state, whose dictator Alejandro Goya opens his country up to democratic elections in the TV show Chuck.  The name is similar to Greek-born movie director Costa-Gavras.
Costaguana: from Joseph Conrad's Nostromo, said to be a hybrid of several real countries.
Country of the Blind: from the short story with the same name by H. G. Wells.
Cotton Coast: White minority-ruled state located on the Virgin Islands.
Diamantara: a republic in South America from the anime Michiko & Hatchin.
Federation of the Americas: a united South America and Central America that invaded the United States in Call of Duty: Ghosts.
Hidalgo: a South American country in Doc Savage: The Man of Bronze.
Inunaguay: An apparently South American nation which appears in the Disney cartoon The Replacements.
Las Acacias (Republica popular de): Country located inside Argentinian territory, as seen in the Argentinian series Telenoche.
Luzaguay: A South American country with a dictatorship government which appears in the game Criminal Case. It mixes elements of Paraguay, Uruguay and North Korea.
Mandoras: A South American country where Adolf Hitler's brain was hidden in Madmen of Mandoras and its extended version, They Saved Hitler's Brain.
Maple White Land: land of Arthur Conan Doyle's The Lost World.
Miranda / The Mirandan Republic: South American nation from Luis Buñuel's film The Discreet Charm of the Bourgeoisie, from which the character Don Rafael is an ambassador to France. It is referred to by several characters as an unpleasant place with a strict military, oppressive leadership, and high murder rate.
Montenegro: South American nation from Centurions TV series.
Nova Jambalaya: a Brazilian favela that has become a city-state with a communist-like dictatorship government in Brazilian sitcom Toma Lá, Dá CáNuevo Rico: South American country from The Adventures of Tintin, neighbouring San Theodoros.
Olifa: country on the Pacific coast of South America in The Courts of the Morning by John Buchan.
Olancho: The setting (described as "one of those little republics down there") of Richard Harding Davis' 1897 novel, Soldiers of Fortune.
Palombia: home of the Marsupilami from the Spirou et Fantasio and Marsupilami comics.
Pelotillehue: Fictional country which is developed Condorito comic series.
Quisto: South American country from Centurions TV series.
República Popular del Tandil: Republic located inside Argentinian territory, with almost five person with passport, and one embassy in Spain.
São Rico: Nation located inside the Patagonian region featured on the tenth volume of The Adventures of Tintin by Belgian cartoonist Hergé.
San Carlos: Latin American nation in the film Delta Force 2: The Colombian Connection.
San Marcos: South American country in an episode of Alarm für Cobra 11 - Die Autobahnpolizei.
San Monté: South American country at the brink of civil war from Action Comics #1.
San Pasquale: South American country in Commander in Chief. Possibly based on Bolivia or Panama.
San Pedro: South American country in the Sherlock Holmes short story "The Adventure of Wisteria Lodge" and in the film Hour of the Assassin.
San Theodoros: South American nation featured in several of The Adventures of Tintin, home of General Alcazar.
Sierra Gordo: a South American country often used as a satire of banana republics in the G.I. Joe comic book series published by Marvel Comics.
Tecala: South American country from the film Proof of Life.
Utopia: from Thomas More's De Optimo Reipublicae Statu deque Nova Insula Utopia.
Vespugia: South American nation located in Patagonia, site of ancient step pyramids and a history of some Welsh settlement, in books by Madeleine L'Engle. In an alternate timeline it was ruled by a dictator who threatened nuclear warfare.
Zalay: a republic in South America from the Dead or Alive video game series.
Zendonia: a communist state in South America from the Dead or Alive video game series.

Unspecified "Latin America" region 
 Avalor: Latin American kingdom set in the computer-animated television series Elena of Avalor.
 Baracas: Latin American country set in CSI: Miami TV show. It is considered more important for support the torture teams of the U.S. forces in the regional area.
 Cortuguay: Latin American country beset by revolution in the Harold Robbins novel The Adventurers and the 1970 film based on the book.
 Curaguay: a generic Latin American banana republic seen in Hunter (1984 U.S. TV series) (S2E6 Raped Part 1 and S2E7 Raped and Revenge Part 2).
 Curuguay: a generic Latin American banana republic seen in The A-Team.
 Curuguay: a generic Latin America country mentioned in The Equaliser (2021) S02E01
 Parador: Latin American country from the film Moon Over Parador.
 Paragonia: Latin American country in the film The Americano.
 Puerto Guavo: Latin American police state in the Joe 90 episode "Big Fish".
 Republica de los Cocos: a Latin American state in Su Excelencia starring Mario Moreno (commonly known as Cantinflas).
 San Cordova: a democracy in Latin America from the Mission: Impossible TV episode "The Elixir".
 San Cristobal: a Latin American democracy in the Mission: Impossible TV episode "The Code".
 San Marcos: Latin American republic in Woody Allen's comedy Bananas.
 San Miguel: small South/Central American dictatorship in the film Deal of the Century.
 San Nicasio: a small country from the TV miniseries Persons Unknown.
 San Pascal: a Latin American country in the Mission: Impossible TV episode "The Catafalque".
 Santa Fe de Tierra firme: A ficticional American country where Ramón del Valle-Inclán's novel Tyrant Banderas takes place. 
 Santales: a small Latin American democracy, from the Mission: Impossible episode "Trek"
 Sapogonia: imaginary country, located somewhere to the south of Mexico, where all mestizos come from, in the novel Sapogonia by Ana Castillo.

References

External links

Americas
 
 
Lists of countries in the Americas